Janko is a name that derives from a diminutive form of the name Jan (Slavic languages), Janez (Slovenian), János (Hungarian), and Yakov/Jacob (Ashkenazi Jewish). It also derives from the vernacular form of Latin Johannes. Notable people with the name include:

Given name 
Janko Benša (born 1977), Serbian distance runner
Janko Bobetko (1919–2003), Croatian general
Janko Brašić (1906–1994), Serbian naïve painter
Janko Drašković (1770–1856), Croatian politician
Janko Dreyer (born 1994), South African cricketer
Janko Gagić (died 1804), Serbian hajduk leader
Janko Gojković (born 1973), Bosnian swimmer
Janko Gredelj (1916–1941), Yugoslav communist
Janko Halkozović (fl. 1757), Serbian painter
Janko Janša (born 1900), Slovenian cross-country skier
Janko Jesenský (1874–1945), Slovak lower nobleman and member of the Slovak national movement
Janko Kamauf (1801–1874), city magistrate of Gradec and mayor of Zagreb, Croatia
Janko Kersnik (1852–1897), Slovene writer and politician
Janko Kobentar (born 1940), Slovenian cross-country skier
Janko Konstantinov (1926–2010), Macedonian architect and artist
Janko Kos (born 1931), Slovenian literary historian
Janko Lavrin (1887–1986), Slovene novelist, poet, critic, translator, and historian
Janko Leskovar (1861–1949), Croatian novelist
Janko Lukovski (born 1946), Macedonian basketball player and coach
Janko Mavrović (born 1977), Croatian team handball player
Janko Mežik (born 1921), Slovenian ski jumper
Janko Mihailović Moler (1792–1853), Serbian priest and artist
Janko Neuber (born 1971), German cross-country skier
Janko Nilović (born 1941), pianist, arranger, and composer
Janko Orožen (1891–1989), Slovene historian and schoolteacher
Janko Pacar  (born 1990), Swiss footballer
Janko Pleterski (1923–2018), Slovenian historian, politician, and diplomat
Janko Premrl (1920–1943), Slovene Partisan
Janko Prunk (born 1942), Slovenian historian
Janko Sanković (fl. 1963–1978), Yugoslavian football goalkeeper
Janko Simović (born 1986), Montenegrin footballer
Janko Smole (1921–2010), Slovenian politician
Janko Tipsarević (born 1984), Serbian tennis player
Janko Tumbasević (born 1985), Montenegrin footballer
Janko Veber (born 1960), Slovenian politician
Janko Veselinović (lawyer) (born 1965), Serbian academic and politician
Janko Veselinović (writer) (1862–1905), Serbian writer
Janko Vranyczany-Dobrinović (1920–2015), Croatian politician and diplomat
Janko Vukotić (1866–1927), Montenegrin general
Janko Vuković (1871–1918), Croatian admiral
Janko Vučinić (1966–2019), Montenegrin professional boxer and politician
Janko Šimrak (1883–1946), Croatian Greek Catholic hierarch
Janko Štefe (1923–?), Slovenian alpine skier

Surname 
Anna Janko (born 1957), Polish poet, writer, columnist and literary critic
Eva Janko (born 1945), Austrian javelin thrower
Lubomír Janko (born 1955), Czech rower
Marc Janko (born 1983), Austrian footballer
Paul von Jankó, Hungarian inventor of the Jankó keyboard
Richard Janko, British-American classicist
Saidy Janko (born 1995), Swiss footballer
Sepp Janko (1905–2001), Volksgruppenführer and SS Obersturmführer
Zvonimir Janko (1932–2022), Croatian mathematician

See also
 Janković, a derived surname

References 

Circassian masculine given names
Croatian masculine given names
Serbian masculine given names
Slovene masculine given names